The Alice M. Ditson Fund, founded in 1940, supports contemporary American music. Significant ongoing awards include the Ditson Conductor's Award.

In its early years, the fund supported notable 20th-century musicians such as Bela Bartok, Benjamin Britten, Aaron Copland, Gian Carlo Menotti, Virgil Thomson, and Walter Piston. From 1945 to 1952, the Fund sponsored the week-long Columbia Festival of Contemporary American Music. The Ditson Fund was also active in supporting the Composers' Forum concerts in New York.

The fund's namesake, Alice Ditson, was the wife of music publisher Charles Healy Ditson and daughter-in-law of Oliver Ditson, founder of the publishing house that bore his name. She was a supporter of American classical music during her lifetime, and her will bequested $400,000 (equivalent to $ million in ) to Columbia University for "the encouragement and aide of musicians."

External links
Alice M. Ditson Fund website
Alice M. Ditson Fund records at the Rare Book and Manuscript Library, Columbia University, New York, New York

References

Classical music in the United States
Charities based in New York (state)
Columbia University